Moral Maze is a live discussion programme on BBC Radio 4, broadcast since 1990. Since November 2011, it has also been available as a podcast.

Structure
Four regular panellists discuss moral and ethical issues raised by a recent news story. Michael Buerk delivers a preamble launching the topic, then a series of 'witnesses' – experts or other relevant people – are questioned by the panellists, who then discuss what each witness said.

Panellists
The regular panellists are:
 Nazir Afzal
 Ash Sarkar
 Andrew Doyle
 Giles Fraser
 Nesrine Malik
 Anne McElvoy
 Melanie Phillips
 Mona Siddiqui
 Tim Stanley
 Matthew Taylor

Notable former panellists include Rabbi Hugo Gryn (who died in 1996), Janet Daley, Edward Pearce, Geoffrey Robertson, Michael Mansfield, politician Michael Gove, Claire Fox, Michael Portillo, Ian Hargreaves, Kenan Malik, scientist Steven Rose, philosophers Simon Blackburn and Roger Scruton, and historian David Starkey, who often attracted controversy for his blunt manner.

History
The first programme on Monday 20 August 1990, was forty minutes long from 11am, and followed by Poetry Please. It was made by the Factual Unit of Religious Programmes (later called Factual Programmes Religion) at BBC North in Manchester. It was hoped that the programme format would involve the panellists' views being revised during the course of a programme, but this rarely happened.

In April 1991, it had moved to Tuesdays, and followed the 9am news, until 9:45am (a slot similar to the current In Our Time). In July 1991, it had moved to 8:05pm until 8:50pm on Fridays, replacing Any Questions? for the summer recess. There was then a repeat at 1pm on the following Saturday, and a phone-in from 2 to 2:30pm, replacing Any Answers?. There was also an end-of-year programme. In July 1992, it had moved to Thursday mornings following the 9am news. It became a de rigueur listen for Westminster MPs. By 1997, it was fifty-five minutes long, lasting until 10am. It moved to Wednesday evenings from 13 May 1998, in the 1998 schedule changes, with a repeat of the forty-five-minute programme on Saturday night at 10:15pm.

Michael Buerk has presented the programme since August 1990. David Aaronovitch has presented occasional episodes during Buerk's absence. More recently Edward Stourton and William Crawley have deputised.

Originally produced at the BBC North West's New Broadcasting House on Oxford Road in Manchester, the programme production base is Salford Quays. The programme is broadcast live from BBC Broadcasting House in London.

TV pilot
In early 1994, a television version was considered, which eventually took off on Saturday 10 September 1994,on BBC2 as a trial series of six 45-minute-long programmes broadcast around midnight, perhaps influenced by Channel 4's successful late-night discussion programme After Dark. The pilot had audiences of around 1.3 million. It was last broadcast on 15 October 1994, at 11pm.

Criticism
In his book Bad Thoughts (US title Crimes Against Logic), libertarian philosopher Jamie Whyte, who has been a witness on the programme, advises readers to listen to The Moral Maze for innumerable examples of faulty reasoning. Journalist and author Nick Cohen has also criticised the programme, in a piece highlighting the media careers of Trotskyite-turned-libertarian former cadres of the Revolutionary Communist Party, centered around the Spiked magazine.

On 2 April 2021, Scottish broadcaster Lesley Riddoch criticised the programme, for taking an approach where observers and experts would discuss a particular problem, without the actual participants being part of the discussion. Riddoch also stated that the programme was too selective, elite and abstract.

See also
 List of national radio programmes made in Manchester
 The Choice – radio series
 Heart of the Matter – BBC One programme presented by Joan Bakewell

References

External links
 Moral Maze minisite on BBC.co.uk

BBC Radio 4 programmes
British religious radio programmes
1990 radio programme debuts
Philosophical mass media